Higgs Discovery: The Power of Empty Space  is a short non-fiction book by Lisa Randall, in which she concentrates on the ideas discussed in her two previous books. Higgs Discovery was initially published on September 24, 2013 by Ecco Press.

Review

 —The Guardian

See also
Higgs boson
Higgs mechanism
Nothing

References

External links

2013 non-fiction books
Physics books
Works about particle physics
String theory books
Cosmology books
Ecco Press books